Prostanthera petrophila is a species of flowering plant in the family Lamiaceae and is endemic to Western Australia. It is a spreading shrub with densely hairy branches, narrow egg-shaped leaves with the narrower end towards the base and white flowers with violet striations in the petal tube.

Description
Flowering occurs in August.

Taxonomy
Prostanthera petrophila was first formally described in 1988 by Barry Conn in the journal Nuytsia from specimens collected near Mount Barloweerie in 1931.

Distribution and habitat
This mintbush grows on laterite and in rock crevices in the Murchison and Yalgoo biogeographic regions of Western Australia.

Conservation status
Prostanthera petrophila is classified as "Priority Three" by the Government of Western Australia Department of Parks and Wildlife meaning that it is poorly known and known from only a few locations but is not under imminent threat.

References

petrophila
Flora of Western Australia
Lamiales of Australia
Taxa named by Barry John Conn
Plants described in 1988